Rigoberto Calderón (born 21 April 1970) is a Nicaraguan former track and field athlete who competed in the javelin throw. He represented his country at the 1997 World Championships in Athletics.

He was twice a silver medallist at the Central American and Caribbean Championships in Athletics, finishing behind Manuel Fuenmayor both times. He was also a bronze medallist at the inaugural 2007 NACAC Championships in Athletics.

He competed for Nicaragua at the 1995 Summer Universiade, 2003 Pan American Games, two editions of the Central American and Caribbean Games, and five editions of the Ibero-American Championships in Athletics. Calderón was highly successful at regional level, taking six consecutive gold medals at the Central American Games from 1990 to 2010 and setting a Games record of 71.00 m. He was also four-time champion at the Central American Championships in Athletics.

International competitions

References

External links

Living people
1970 births
Nicaraguan male javelin throwers
World Athletics Championships athletes for Nicaragua
Pan American Games competitors for Nicaragua
Athletes (track and field) at the 1991 Pan American Games
Athletes (track and field) at the 1995 Pan American Games
Athletes (track and field) at the 2003 Pan American Games
Central American Games gold medalists for Nicaragua
Central American Games medalists in athletics
Central American Games bronze medalists for Nicaragua
Competitors at the 2006 Central American and Caribbean Games
Competitors at the 2010 Central American and Caribbean Games
20th-century Nicaraguan people
21st-century Nicaraguan people